Leon Kratzer (born 4 February 1997) is a German professional basketball player for Telekom Baskets Bonn of the Basketball Bundesliga (BBL).

Career 
The son of former professional basketball player Marc Suhr, a 7-foot center who won four caps for the German men's national team during his career, Kratzer started out with BBC Bayreuth’s youth team at age 12, moving on to the Brose Bamberg youth program in 2012. Representing Bamberg's development squad Baunach Young Pikes, he made his debut in Germany's third-tier ProB during the 2013-14 season, helping the team win promotion to ProA that year. Kratzer made his first appearances in Germany's top-flight Basketball Bundesliga for Bamberg in the 2016-17 campaign, while still being a regular in the reserve team. Averaging 14.6 points, 12.7 rebounds and 1.5 blocks a game for Baunach in 2016-17, he garnered ProA Player of the Year honors.

Looking to take the next step in his career and to gain more playing time in the Bundesliga, he signed on loan for s.Oliver Würzburg in June 2017.

On November 20, 2018, he has signed with Skyliners Frankfurt of the Basketball Bundesliga.

On July 31, 2020, he has signed with Telekom Baskets Bonn of the Basketball Bundesliga (BBL).

International career 
Kratzer represented the German junior national teams at the 2013 FIBA Europe Under-16 Championships, the 2015 FIBA Europe Under-18 Championships, 2016 FIBA Europe Under-20 Championships and 2017 FIBA Europe Under-20 Championships.

References

1997 births
Living people
Baunach Young Pikes players
Brose Bamberg players
Centers (basketball)
German men's basketball players
Sportspeople from Bayreuth
S.Oliver Würzburg players
Skyliners Frankfurt players
Telekom Baskets Bonn players